[[File:USS Abraham Lincoln (CVN-72) Mission Accomplished.jpg|thumb|The [[USS Abraham Lincoln (CVN-72)|USS Abraham

']] returning to port carrying the Mission Accomplished banner]]

The Mission Accomplished speech (named for a banner displayed above the speaker) was a televised address by United States President George W. Bush on the aircraft carrier USS Abraham Lincoln on May 1, 2003.

Bush, who had launched the U.S.-led invasion of Iraq six weeks earlier, mounted a podium before a White House-produced banner that said "Mission Accomplished". Reading from a prepared text, he said, "Major combat operations in Iraq have ended. In the battle of Iraq, the United States and our allies have prevailed" because "the regime [the Iraqi dictatorship of Saddam Hussein] is no more". Although Bush went on to say that "Our mission continues" and "We have difficult work to do in Iraq," his words implied that the Iraq War was over and America had won. 

Bush's assertions—and the sign itself—became controversial as the Iraqi insurgency gained pace and developed into a full-on sectarian war. The vast majority of casualties, U.S. and Iraqi, military and civilian, occurred after the speech. U.S. troops fought in Iraq for eight more years.

Description

On May 1, 2003, Bush became the first sitting president to arrive in an arrested landing in a fixed-wing aircraft on an aircraft carrierRichard Nixon had landed aboard the USS Hornet in a helicopter for the Apollo 11 recovery, but not in an arrested landing.   when he arrived at the USS Abraham Lincoln in a Lockheed S-3 Viking, dubbed Navy One, as the carrier lay just off the San Diego coast, having returned from combat operations in the Persian Gulf. He posed for photographs with pilots and members of the ship's crew while wearing a flight suit. A few hours later, he gave a speech announcing the end of major combat operations in the Iraq War. Behind and above him hung a banner that said "Mission Accomplished."

Bush was criticized for the historic jet landing on the carrier as an overly theatrical and expensive stunt. For instance, it was pointed out that the carrier was well within range of Bush's helicopter, and that a jet landing was not needed. Originally, White House officials had said the carrier was too far off the California coast for a helicopter landing and a jet would be needed to reach it. On the day of the speech, the Lincoln was only  from shore but the administration still decided to go ahead with the jet landing. White House spokesman Ari Fleischer admitted that Bush "could have helicoptered, but the plan was already in place. Plus, he wanted to see a landing the way aviators see a landing."  The Lincoln made a scheduled stop in Pearl Harbor shortly before the speech, docked in San Diego after the speech, and returned to her home port in Everett, Washington, on May 6, 2003.

The S-3 that served as "Navy One" was retired from service and placed on display at the National Museum of Naval Aviation in Pensacola, Florida, on July 17, 2003. The museum makes it clear that Bush was a passenger – not the pilot – of the plane. While Bush trained and served as a jet pilot in the Air National Guard flying F-102 fighter-interceptors, he was never trained to land on a carrier.

In the speech, Bush said, "Major combat operations in Iraq have ended. In the battle of Iraq, the United States and our allies have prevailed." He also said, "We have difficult work to do in Iraq. We are bringing order to parts of that country that remain dangerous." And he added, "Our mission continues...The War on Terror continues, yet it is not endless. We do not know the day of final victory, but we have seen the turning of the tide."

The speech and the "Mission Accomplished" banner were swiftly criticized by people who pointed out that the war was hardly over. Media questions about the banner appeared to surprise U.S. government officials, who initially offered different accounts of its origin and its meaning. 

Navy Cmdr. Conrad Chun, a Pentagon spokesman, said the banner referred specifically to the aircraft carrier's 10-month deployment (the longest carrier deployment since the Vietnam War) and not the war itself: "It truly did signify a mission accomplished for the crew."

The White House claimed that the banner was requested by the crew of the ship, who did not have the facilities for producing such a banner. Later, the administration and naval sources said that the banner was the Navy's idea, White House staff members made the banner, and it was hung by Navy sailors. White House spokesman Scott McClellan told CNN, "We took care of the production of it. We have people to do those things. But the Navy actually put it up." According to John Dickerson of Time magazine, the White House later conceded that they hung the banner but still insisted it had been done at the request of the crew members.

Subsequently, the White House released a statement saying that the sign and Bush's visit referred to the initial invasion of Iraq.

When he received an advance copy of the speech, U.S. Defense Secretary Donald Rumsfeld took care to remove any use of the phrase "Mission Accomplished" in the speech itself. Later, when journalist Bob Woodward asked him about his changes to the speech, Rumsfeld responded: "I was in Baghdad, and I was given a draft of that thing to look at. And I just died, and I said my God, it's too conclusive. And I fixed it and sent it back... they fixed the speech, but not the sign."

Bush did offer a "Mission Accomplished" message to the troops in Afghanistan at Camp As Sayliyah on June 5, 2003 – about a month after the aircraft carrier speech: "America sent you on a mission to remove a grave threat and to liberate an oppressed people, and that mission has been accomplished."

For critics of the war, the photo-op became a symbol of the Bush administration's unrealistic goals and perceptions of the conflict. Anti-war activists questioned the integrity and realism of Bush's "major combat" statement. The banner came to symbolize the irony of Bush giving a victory speech only a few weeks after the beginning of the fifth longest war in American history. US military deaths in Iraq war at 4,452

In a less publicized incident, Rumsfeld also declared an end to major combat operations in Afghanistan on May 1, a few hours before Bush's announcement.

Subsequent events
In November 2008, soon after the presidential election in which Democrat Barack Obama was chosen to succeed him, Bush indicated that he regretted the use of the banner, stating in a CNN interview, "To some, it said, well, 'Bush thinks the war in Iraq is over,' when I didn't think that. It conveyed the wrong message."

In January 2009, Bush said that "Clearly, putting 'Mission Accomplished' on an aircraft carrier was a mistake."

In 2010, the "Mission Accomplished" banner was transferred from the National Archives to the collection of the George W. Bush Presidential Center. The banner is not on display.

American deaths in the Iraq War totaled 104 when President Bush gave his Mission Accomplished speech. After that speech another 3,424 Americans were killed in the Iraq War by February 2011 when American combat operations there halted.

In culture

Iraq War opponents have used the phrase "mission accomplished" in an ironic sense, while others have non-politically cited it as an example of a general public relations failure. In addition, some mainstream outlets questioned the state of the war with derivatives of this statement. For example, the October 6, 2003 cover of Time featured the headline "Mission Not Accomplished." 

On April 30, 2008, White House Press Secretary Dana Perino said "President Bush is well aware that the banner should have been much more specific and said 'mission accomplished for these sailors who are on this ship on their mission.' And we have certainly paid a price for not being more specific on that banner." On May 5, 2008, The Daily Show mocked her statement by producing a graphic of what such a sign might have looked like.
In 2004, comedic writer Wayne Lammers wrote and sang a song titled "Mission Accomplished" which was included in the Grammy-nominated CD, "The Best of the Al Franken Show" and on his own 2004 CD of satirical songs, "GOP Party Monsters".
In 2004, the HBO original series The Wire ended its third season with an episode titled "Mission Accomplished".  In an audio commentary for that episode, the show's creator David Simon said that the third season of the show symbolized the War in Iraq.
In 2004, the Fox television show Arrested Development mocked the Mission Accomplishment speech and banner in the episode "The One Where They Build a House." The episode features the unveiling of a "Mission Accomplished" banner after the Bluth family constructs a fake model home. The banner gag returns in two later episodes, "The Immaculate Election" and "The Cabin Show."
The 2005 song "Dirty Harry" from British alternative band Gorillaz' contains the lyrics: "The war is over, so says the speaker with the flight suit on", a reference to the "Mission Accomplished" speech.
A 2007 episode of the NBC comedy drama Scrubs showed the central character J.D. trying to learn about the Iraq War by reading the (fictitious) book Iraq War for Dummies.  He complains that "I just got to the point where President Bush gave his "mission accomplished" speech on a battleship and I still got, like, 400 more pages to go."
In March 2008 a book entitled Mission Accomplished! (or How We Won the War in Iraq) was released. A continuation of the "Experts Speak" series from the Institute of Expertology, this book by Christopher Cerf and Victor Navasky, with illustrations by Robert Grossman, is a compilation of hundreds of quotations from prominent figures in the media and government concerning military operations in Iraq.
In 2008, the band Third Eye Blind's song "Non Dairy Creamer" includes the lyrics "Mission Accomplished" as a satire of American society's corruption.
The May 10, 2009 episode of The Simpsons, entitled "Four Great Women and a Manicure", depicted Queen Elizabeth I (as played by Patty Bouvier) standing under a "Miſſion Accomplished" banner on the shores of England, prior to a battle between the heavily outnumbered English Navy and the Spanish Armada.
In 2009, the comedy trio The Lonely Island's video for I'm on a Boat, Andy Samberg was depicted in a flight suit while rapping in front of reporters, parodying the flight suit worn by President Bush.
In 2012, Saturday Night Live had Will Ferrell reprise his role as George W. Bush where his skit had the line "Mission Accomplished! It's just something I like to say when a problem isn't solved, but I don't like to talk about it anymore."
In 2014, energy drink company Red Bull used the question "Mission not yet accomplished?" for promotional signs in Kangaroo Express convenience stores.
On April 14, 2018, President Donald Trump tweeted "Mission Accomplished!" following a US-led airstrike on Syria in response to the alleged use of chemical weapons by the Assad regime. Critics were quick to point out the similarities to Bush's speech.
Released on the 4th of July, 2018, Iraqi rapper IN-Z referenced the speech with a copy of the Mission Accomplished banner in the backdrop of the music video for This is Iraq, his This Is America parody.
The 2018 biographical film Vice includes a scene where Sam Rockwell stands in front of the USS Abraham Lincoln as George W. Bush.

See also 
 American-led intervention in Iraq (2014–2021)

References

External links

Commander in Chief lands on USS Lincoln CNN.com, May 2, 2003
President Bush Announces Major Combat Operations in Iraq Have Ended, White House transcript of Bush's speech, May 1, 2003
'Mission Accomplished' Whodunit  CBSnews.com'', October 29, 2003
White House press release discussing/explaining 'Mission Accomplished' banner, October 29, 2003

Mission Accomplished Speech, 2003
2003 speeches
2003 in military history
American political catchphrases
Iraq War
May 2003 events in the United States
Speeches by George W. Bush
Political quotes
George W. Bush administration controversies